Ejer is the highest town in Denmark at 160 meters (520 feet). The placename, of uncertain etymology, was first recorded in 1437 as Eyer, and in 1492 as Eyerd.

References

Cities and towns in Denmark
Skanderborg Municipality